Marguerite Yourcenar (born Marguerite Antoinette Jeanne Marie Ghislaine Cleenewerck de Crayencour; 8 June 1903 – 17 December 1987) was a Belgian-born French novelist and essayist, who became a US citizen in 1947. Winner of the Prix Femina and the Erasmus Prize, she was the first woman elected to the Académie Française, in 1980, as well as the seventeenth person to occupy seat 3.

Biography
Yourcenar was born Marguerite Antoinette Jeanne Marie Ghislaine Cleenewerck de Crayencour in Brussels, Belgium, to Michel Cleenewerck de Crayencour, of French bourgeois descent, originating from French Flanders, a very wealthy landowner, and a Belgian mother, Fernande de Cartier de Marchienne, of Belgian nobility, who died ten days after her birth. She grew up in the home of her paternal grandmother. She adopted the surname Yourcenar – an almost anagram of Crayencour, having one fewer c – as a pen name; in 1947 she also took it as her legal surname.

Yourcenar's first novel, Alexis, was published in 1929. She translated Virginia Woolf's The Waves over a 10-month period in 1937.
In 1939, her partner at the time, the literary scholar and Kansas City native Grace Frick, invited Yourcenar to the United States to escape the outbreak of World War II in Europe. She lectured in comparative literature in New York City and Sarah Lawrence College.

Yourcenar was a lesbian; she and Frick became lovers in 1937 and remained together until Frick's death in 1979 and a tormented relationship with Jerry Wilson. After ten years spent in Hartford, Connecticut, they bought a house in Northeast Harbor, Maine, on Mount Desert Island, where they lived for decades. They are buried alongside each other at Brookside Cemetery, Somesville, Mount Desert, Maine.

In 1951, she published, in France, the novel Memoirs of Hadrian, which she had been writing on-and-off for a decade. The novel was an immediate success and met with great critical acclaim. In this novel, Yourcenar recreated the life and death of one of the great rulers of the ancient world, the Roman emperor Hadrian, who writes a long letter to Marcus Aurelius, the son and heir of Antoninus Pius, his successor and adoptive son. The Emperor meditates on his past, describing both his triumphs and his failures, his love for Antinous, and his philosophy. The novel has become a modern classic.

In 1980, Yourcenar was the first female member elected to the Académie française. An anecdote tells of how the bathroom labels were then changed in this male-dominated institution: "Messieurs|Marguerite Yourcenar" (Gents/Marguerite Yourcenar). She published many novels, essays, and poems, as well as a trilogy of memoirs. At the time of her death, she was working on the third volume, called Quoi? L'Eternité.

Yourcenar's house on Mount Desert Island, Petite Plaisance, is now a museum dedicated to her memory. She is buried across the sound in Somesville, Maine.

Legacy and honors
1952, Prix Femina Vacaresco for Mémoires d'Hadrien (Memoirs of Hadrian)
1958, Prix Renée Vivien for Les charités d'Alcippe (The Alms of Alcippe)
1963, Prix Combat for Sous bénéfice d'inventaire (The Dark Brain of Piranesi)
1968, Prix Femina for L'Œuvre au noir (The Abyss)
1972, Prix Prince Pierre de Monaco for her entire oeuvre
1974, Grand Prix national de la culture for Souvenirs pieux (Dear Departed)
1977, Grand Prix de l'Académie française for her entire oeuvre
1980, elected to the Académie française, the first woman so honored
1983, winner of the Erasmus Prize for contributions to European literature and culture
1987, Fellow of the American Academy of Arts and Sciences
2003, 12 November: Belgium issues a postage stamp (Code 200320B) with the value of 0.59 Euro.
2020, Google celebrated her 117th birthday with a Google Doodle.

Bibliography

 Le jardin des chimères (1921)
 Les dieux ne sont pas morts (1922)
 Alexis ou le traité du vain combat (1929) – translated as Alexis by Walter Kaiser; 
 La nouvelle Eurydice (1931)
 Pindare (1932)
 Denier du rêve (1934, revised 1958–59) – translated as A Coin in Nine Hands by Dori Katz; 
 La mort conduit l'attelage (1934)
 Feux (prose poem, 1936) – translated as Fires by Dori Katz; 
 Nouvelles orientales (short stories, 1938) – translated as Oriental Tales;  (includes "Comment Wang-Fô fut sauvé", first published 1936, filmed by René Laloux)
 Les songes et les sorts (1938) – translated as Dreams and Destinies by Donald Flanell Friedman
 Le coup de grâce (1939) – translated as Coup de Grace by Grace Frick; 
 Mémoires d'Hadrien (1951) – translated as Memoirs of Hadrian by Grace Frick; 
 Électre ou la chute des masques (1954)
 Les charités d'Alcippe (1956)
 Constantin Cavafy (1958)
 Sous bénéfice d'inventaire (1962)
 Fleuve profond, sombre rivière: les negros spirituals (1964)
 L'Œuvre au noir (novel, 1968, Prix Femina 1968) – translated as The Abyss, or Zeno of Bruges by Grace Frick (1976)
 Théâtre, 1971
 Souvenirs pieux (1974) – translated as Dear Departed: A Memoir by Maria Louise Ascher; 
 Archives du Nord (1977) – translated as How Many Years: A Memoir by Maria Louise Ascher
 Le labyrinthe du monde (1974–84)
 Mishima ou la vision du vide (essay, 1980) – translated as Mishima: A Vision of the Void; 
 Anna, soror... (1981)
 Comme l'eau qui coule (1982) translated as Two Lives and a Dream. Includes "Anna, Soror...", "An Obscure Man", and "A Lovely Morning".
 Le temps, ce grand sculpteur (1984) – translated as That Mighty Sculptor, Time by Walter Kaiser, essays: 
 The Dark Brain of Piranesi and Other Essays (1984) – translated by Richard Howard; 
 "La Couronne et la Lyre." Χατζηνικολής editions (1986)
 Quoi? L'Éternité (1988)

Other works available in English translation
 A Blue Tale and Other Stories; . Three stories written between 1927 and 1930, translated and published 1995.
 With Open Eyes: Conversations with Matthieu GaleyReferences

Sources
 Joan E. Howard, From Violence to Vision: Sacrifice in the Works of Marguerite Yourcenar (1992)
 Josyane Savigneau, Marguerite Yourcenar: Inventing a Life (1993).
 George Rousseau, Marguerite Yourcenar: A Biography (London: Haus Publishing, 2004).
 Judith Holland Sarnecki, Subversive Subjects: Reading Marguerite Yourcenar (2004)
 Giorgetto Giorgi, "Il Grand Tour e la scoperta dell’antico nel Labyrinthe du monde di Marguerite Yourcenar," in Sergio Audano, Giovanni Cipriani (ed.), Aspetti della Fortuna dell'Antico nella Cultura Europea: atti della settima giornata di studi, Sestri Levante, 19 March 2010 (Foggia: Edizioni il Castello, 2011) (Echo, 1), 99–108.
 Les yeux ouverts, entretiens avec Mathieu Galey (Éditions du Centurion « Les interviews », 1980).
 Bérengère Deprez, Marguerite Yourcenar et les États-Unis. Du nageur à la vague, Éditions Racine, 2012, 192 p.
 Bérengère Deprez, Marguerite Yourcenar and the United States. From Prophecy to Protest, Peter Lang, coll. « Yourcenar », 2009, 180 p.
 Deprez, Marguerite Yourcenar. Écriture, maternité, démiurgie, essai, Bruxelles, Archives et musée de la littérature/PIE-Peter Lang, coll. « Documents pour l’histoire des francophonies », 2003, 330 p.
 Donata Spadaro, Marguerite Yourcenar et l'écriture autobiographique : Le Labyrinthe du monde, bull. SIEY, no 17, décembre 1996, p. 69 à 83
 Donata Spadaro, Marguerite Yourcenar e l'autobiografia (ADP, 2014)
 Mireille Brémond, Marguerite Yourcenar, une femme à l'Académie (Garnier, 2019);.

External links

 Marguerite Yourcenar, alchimie du paysage'', a documentary film by Jacques Loeuille, France Télévisions 2014.
 
 
 
Marguerite Yourcenar et Suzanne Lilar : plus qu’une rencontre, une complicité by Michèle Goslar
 English translations of Marguerite Yourcenar by Walter Jacob Kaiser, Catalogue of correspondence and manuscripts concerning Walter Kaiser's English translation of works by French writer Marguerite Yourcenar, Houghton Library, Harvard University

1903 births
1987 deaths
Belgian expatriates in the United States
Belgian emigrants to the United States
Belgian people of French descent
Belgian women novelists
Belgian essayists
Belgian women poets
Bisexual women
French bisexual writers
American bisexual writers
French women novelists
French women poets
French emigrants to the United States
French expatriates in the United States
Commandeurs of the Légion d'honneur
Members of the Académie Française
Members of the American Academy of Arts and Letters
Officers of the Ordre national du Mérite
People from Northeast Harbor, Maine
Prix Femina winners
Sarah Lawrence College faculty
French LGBT novelists
French LGBT poets
Fellows of the American Academy of Arts and Sciences
20th-century French novelists
20th-century Belgian poets
20th-century French women writers
20th-century Belgian novelists
20th-century French essayists
Members of the Académie royale de langue et de littérature françaises de Belgique
People with acquired American citizenship
French historical novelists
Women historical novelists
Writers of historical fiction set in antiquity
American writers in French
20th-century American writers
20th-century LGBT people